is the fifth studio album by Japanese singer/songwriter Chisato Moritaka, released on October 17, 1990 by Warner Pioneer. A limited edition release included a 32-page photo book.

Kokon Tozai became Moritaka's first and only album to hit No. 1 on Oricon's albums chart and sold over 354,000 copies. It also placed at No. 29 on Oricon's 1990 year-ending albums chart. In addition, it was certified Gold by the RIAJ.

Track listing 
All lyrics are written by Chisato Moritaka, except where indicated; all music is composed and arranged by Hideo Saitō, except where indicated.

Personnel 
 Chisato Moritaka – vocals, piano (3)
 Hideo Saitō – all instruments, programming, backing vocals (all tracks except where indicated)
 Yuichi Takahashi – all instruments, backing vocals (10, 13)
 Yukio Seto – guitar (3, 13)
 Seiji Matsuura – backing vocals (6–8, 10, 13, 15, 16), guitar (13)
 Carnation (18)
 Masataro Naoe – guitar
 Osamu Toba – guitar
 Yuji Mada – bass
 Yuichi Tanaya – keyboards, backing vocals
 Hiroshi Yabe – drums

Charts

Certification

Cover versions 
 W covered "Uchi ni Kagitte Sonna Koto wa Nai Hazu" in their 2019 EP Choi Waru Devil.

References

External links 
 
 
 

1990 albums
Chisato Moritaka albums
Japanese-language albums
Warner Music Japan albums